Southern Horizons is an album by Jamaican saxophonist Joe Harriott recorded in England in 1959 and 1960 and released on the Jazzland label.

Reception

Leonard Feather, the contemporaneous DownBeat reviewer, criticized the thinness of the audio quality and commented on the ordinariness of the original compositions, with the exceptions of "Liggin'" and the title track.

Track listing
All compositions by Joe Harriott except as indicated
 "Still Goofin'" - 2:45   
 "Count Twelve" - 3:38   
 "Señor Blues" (Horace Silver) - 4:00   
 "Southern Horizons" - 6:33 (Harry South)
 "Jumpin' with Joe" - 3:28 (South)
 "Liggin'" - 5:48 (South)
 "Caravan" (Duke Ellington, Juan Tizol, Irving Mills) - 5:40   
 "You Go to My Head" (J. Fred Coots, Haven Gillespie) - 6:32   
 "Tuesday Morning Swing" - 3:00

Personnel
Joe Harriott – alto saxophone
Hank Shaw – trumpet (tracks 1–3, 5)
Shake Keane – trumpet, flugelhorn (tracks 4, 6–9)
Harry South – piano
Coleridge Goode – bass
Bobby Orr – drums
Frank Holder – bongos (tracks 4, 7)

Source:

References 

Jazzland Records (1960) albums
Joe Harriott albums
1960 debut albums